KCII is a radio station based in Washington, Iowa, 30 minutes south of Iowa City.  The station is broadcast on 1380 AM and its translator 102.5 MHz FM. It is a full-service classic hits music station that broadcasts news, sports, community events, severe weather bulletins, and agriculture information.  KCII simulcasts with KCII-FM.  KCII is a part of the Cedar Rapids ADI market as recorded by Arbitron. It was first licensed on February 1, 1962.

KCII is on air 24 hours per day. A full programming list is at kciiradio.com.

KCII 1380 AM was first started in 1961. The studio is located at 110 E Main Street near the Town Square in Washington.

External links
KCII website

FCC History Cards for KCII

CII
Full service radio stations in the United States